Brumov-Bylnice is a town in Zlín District in the Zlín Region of the Czech Republic. It has about 5,500 inhabitants. The centre of the town is historically significant and is protected by law as urban monument zone. The historic centre of Brumov and the workers' colony are well preserved and are protected by law as two urban monument zones.

Administrative parts
Brumov-Bylnice is made up of town parts of Brumov and Bylnice, and of villages of Sidonie and Svatý Štěpán.

Geography

Brumov-Bylnice is situated in the White Carpathians mountain range and in the eponymous protected landscape area. The Brumovka creek flows through the town.

History
In around 1225, a late Romanesque royal castle was built in Brumov, one of the oldest in Moravia. The first written mention of Brumov is from 1255. The castle and the village were owned by Olřich of Hradec at the turn of the 13th and 14th centuries, and by Boček of Kunštát in the early 15th century. After the Hussite Wars, the castle became a royal property again. In the 15th century, Brumov ofter changed its owners and was used for marauding raids into the surrounding area and especially into Hungary.

The village of Bylnice was first mentioned in 1424 as a part of the Brumov dominion and shared history and owners with it. In 1503, Brumov was first referred to as a town. In the early 16th century, Brumov was acquired by the lords of Lomnice who rebuilt the castle and made it the main seat of their Moravian properties. During their rule Brumov prospered. They sold Brumov to Zdeněk Kavka of Říčany in 1574.

In the 17th century, Brumov and Bylnice suffered from invasions of raiders because these were the first settlements that the enemy encountered on the way from Hungary. After the invasion of the Turks and Tatars in 1663, Brumov was burned and almost destroyed. In 1683 Brumov was looted and devastated by rebels under the lead of Emeric Thököly and again in 1704 under the lead of Francis II Rákóczi. Brumov lost its significance.

During the 18th and 19th centuries, both Brumov and Bylnice recovered, but prosperity was hampered by fires and cholera epidemics. The railway to Bylnice was built in 1887 and became an important factor in the development of the area. A railway line was constructed in Brumov in 1928.

On 1 July 1964, the two municipalities Brumov and Bylnice were merged to form Brumov-Bylnice, and the new municipality gained the statute of a town. Since 1976, the villages of Svatý Štěpán and Sidonie were joined to the town. In 1997, the Czech-Slovak border was changed and part of the hitherto Slovak territory was annexed to Brumov-Bylnice.

Demographics

Sights

The ruins of the royal castle is the most significant monument Brumov-Bylnice and one of the most important historic monuments in the region. It was one of the most important castles in Moravia. The castle was damaged by a fire in 1760 and abandoned after 1826.

The parish Church of Saint Wenceslaus in Brumov probably existed already in the late 13th or early 14th century. It was completely rebuilt in 1511 and the tower was added. In 1834, it was rebuilt into its current form. The valuable bell is from 1671.

The baroque sculptural group of the Holy Trinity on the square is from 1777. Other sculptures in the town are Saint John of Nepomuk (created in 1730), Saint Florian (created in 1755), and Saint Gotthard (created in 1771).

The Jewish cemetery on the outskirts of the town is the only in the territory of Zlín District. Existence of the cemetery is first documented in 1758.

The workers' colony documents the standard of living of the glass workers from the end of the 19th and the beginning of the 20th century. However, this unique and historically rare set of former workers' dwellings is today altered by different adjustments of the owners of individual houses. The whole block is covered with a gabled roof with wooden dormers.

Notable people
Ludvík Vaculík (1926–2015), writer and journalist
Tomáš Řepka (born 1974), footballer

Twin towns – sister cities

Brumov-Bylnice is twinned with:
 Horné Srnie, Slovakia

Gallery

References

External links

Cities and towns in the Czech Republic
Populated places in Zlín District
Moravian Wallachia